Queen Victoria School (QVS) is a non-selective, co-educational, boarding school predominantly for children of Scottish Servicemen/women (but see full admissions criteria, below) aged 10/11 to 18. It occupies a Scottish Baronial-style building on a rural campus just outside Dunblane, a short distance away from the city of Stirling, Scotland. It is the only school in the United Kingdom managed and funded by the Ministry of Defence (Duke of York's Royal Military School in Kent is now managed by the DfE).

History
The idea of the school was originally proposed to Queen Victoria as a memorial to the Scottish dead of the Boer Wars, and after her death it was thought fit to name it in her memory. With the support of former politician Robert Cranston, money was raised from Scottish servicemen and the people of Scotland to complete the project. Queen Victoria School was opened on 28 September 1908 by King Edward VII. The chapel was completed in 1910 and is Scotland's memorial to Queen Victoria. Girls were admitted in the 1996–97 academic year into all years and the first female senior monitor, Victoria Harris, was chosen in 1999.

Admissions
Originally only sons (and subsequently daughters) of Scottish Service personnel were eligible to apply for entry to QVS. Today the school is not only open to applications from children of regular UK Armed Forces personnel who are Scottish, but also those who have served in Scotland or are/have been part of a Scottish Regiment. Individuals without a formal Scottish link may also apply.

Curriculum
QVS uses the Scottish curriculum for excellence and pupils are prepared for National Qualifications (Nat 4–5), Highers and Advanced Highers.

Traditions

Traditionally the school provided an austere but continuous education for Scottish war orphans, with a good deal of military training and sports. Since the Second World War, the school has provided an education to children whose parents or guardians have been travelling the world in the Armed Forces.

A strong military ethos is still maintained by a competing pipe band and Combined Cadet Force (CCF) section. The school has its own "colours" which are paraded nearly every Sunday during term times in the school chapel, its own cap badge, and pupils wear the Clan Stewart hunting tartan. The school pipe band used to play at every rugby home international at Murrayfield Stadium, Edinburgh.

Houses
The house system is based on the boarding programme as all pupils are boarders. Boarding is available to pupils aged 10 (Primary 7) and above. There are four houses:

Combined Cadet Force
The School has strong military links with attendance at the Combined Cadet Force timetabled weekly. The pupils elect to join one of the three sections, they are Royal Navy, British Army or Royal Air Force.

Commanding officers:

Notable alumni
Former students of Queen Victoria School are referred to as Old Victorians. See also :Category:People educated at Queen Victoria School, Dunblane.
MacDonald Brothers, pipers and folk musicians
Thomas McQuesten, Member of the Legislative Assembly of Ontario
Anthony Rogers, actor
Kyle Rowe, Scotland and London Irish Professional Rugby Player

References

External links 
Queen Victoria School homepage
Profile on Scottish Schools Online
Education Opportunities for the Children of Service Personnel
Old Victorians Association (Alumni Association)

Military schools in the United Kingdom
Category A listed buildings in Stirling (council area)
Private schools in Stirling (council area)
Boarding schools in Stirling (council area)
Educational institutions established in 1908
Military of Scotland
Buildings and structures in Dunblane
Ministry of Defence (United Kingdom)
1908 establishments in Scotland
Preparatory schools associated with the Royal Navy